The Ministry of Public Works (Including Public Undertakings) is a Ministry of the Government of Maharashtra. 
state.

The Ministry is headed by a cabinet level Minister. Eknath Shinde
is Current Chief Minister of Maharashtra and Minister of Public Works (Including Public Undertakings) Government of Maharashtra.

Head office

List of Cabinet Ministers

List of Ministers of State

References 

Government of Maharashtra
Government ministries of Maharashtra
State Public Works Departments of India